Eagle Lake is a city in southeastern Colorado County, Texas, United States. The population was 3,442 at the 2020 census. It is home to a golf course, the largest private lake in Texas, and the Eagle Lake Regional Airport, which serves light aircraft.

The lake, along with adjacent rice fields, attracts a large variety of migratory birds. The city is known as the "Goose-hunting Capital of the World" and also borders a wildlife preserve.

History 
The first newspaper in Eagle Lake was established by Joseph J. Mansfield in the 1880s.

Geography

U.S. Route 90 Alternate (US 90 Alt.) travels through Eagle Lake, leading east  to Houston and west  to Hallettsville.

Demographics

As of the 2020 United States census, there were 3,442 people, 1,109 households, and 782 families residing in the city.

As of the census of 2000, 3,664 people, 1,296 households, and 935 families resided in the city. The population density was 1,344.6 people per square mile (520.1/km2). The 1,500 housing units averaged 550.5/sq mi (212.9/km2). The racial makeup of the city was 52.78% White, 23.39% African American, 0.66% Native American, 0.03% Pacific Islander, 20.47% from other races, and 2.67% from two or more races. Hispanics or Latinos of any race were 44.21% of the population.

Of the 1,296 households, 36.3% had children under the age of 18 living with them, 52.0% were married couples living together, 16.5% had a female householder with no husband present, and 27.8% were not families. About 23.8% of all households were made up of individuals, and 11.5% had someone living alone who was 65 years of age or older. The average household size was 2.78 and the average family size was 3.31.

In the city, the population was distributed as 29.9% under the age of 18, 9.2% from 18 to 24, 25.0% from 25 to 44, 22.0% from 45 to 64, and 13.9% who were 65 years of age or older. The median age was 34 years. For every 100 females, there were 95.9 males. For every 100 females age 18 and over, there were 91.9 males.

Economy
Historically, Eagle Lake has been an agricultural community, with rice being the main crop. Other key products include cotton, grain, and cattle, along with sand and gravel from mines in the surrounding area. 

In the 2000 census, the median income for a household in the city was $27,101, and for a family was $29,201. Males had a median income of $26,025 versus $20,299 for females. The per capita income for the city was $12,426. About 15.0% of families and 19.7% of the population were below the poverty line, including 24.0% of those under age 18 and 17.8% of those age 65 or over.

Education
Eagle Lake is served by the Rice Consolidated Independent School District.

The Eula and David Wintermann Library is the public library in the city, opened on February 9, 1975. Mr. and Mrs. David R. Wintermann had originally proposed to erect and furnish the new library building in 1973. Architect for the project was Arthur J. Willrodt of Columbus, Texas. It replaced the existing library, which was housed in a small portion of the Community Center.

The designated community college for Rice CISD is Wharton County Junior College.

Media
The city is served by a weekly newspaper, the Colorado County Citizen.

See also

 Continental Express Flight 2574

References

External links
 City of Eagle Lake official website
 Eagle Lake Headlight Online

Cities in Texas
Cities in Colorado County, Texas